Heris (also Romanized as Herīs and Harīs; also known as Hiriz) is a city in the Central District of Heris County, East Azerbaijan province, Iran, and serves as capital of the county. At the 2006 census, its population was 9,513 in 2,359 households. The following census in 2011 counted 9,823 people in 2,704 households. The latest census in 2016 showed a population of 10,515 people in 3,114 households.

Heris is the center of one of the weaving areas in the Iranian part of Azerbaijan, and gave its name to Heriz rugs.

References 

Heris County

Cities in East Azerbaijan Province

Populated places in East Azerbaijan Province

Populated places in Heris County